The Millennium class is a class of four cruise ships of Celebrity Cruises. The ships were built between 1999 and 2002 at Chantiers de l’Atlantique in Saint Nazaire.

Ships

References 

Cruise ship classes
Ships of Celebrity Cruises